Shri Radha Damodar Temple is a Hindu temple dedicated to Hindu deities Radha and Krishna. The temple is situated in Vrindavan of Indian state Uttar Pradesh. In the temple, Krishna is worshiped in the form of Damodar with his consort Radha. It is one of the main seven Goswami temples of Vrindavan.

History 
Shri Radha Damodar Temple was first established by Jiva Goswami in the year 1542 C.E and was located at Seva Kunj of Vrindavan. Later, In 1670, when the Muslim emperor Aurangazeb invaded Vrindavana, the original deities Radha Damodar were shifted to Jaipur for sometime and when the social conditions became favorable, deities were brought back to Vrindavan in the year 1739 C.E. The deities Radha Damodar have been served in Vrindavan since then. Before the disappearance of Jiva Goswami in 1596, he left the deities in the care of his successor Krishna Dasa, the head priest. Presently, the descendants of Krishna Dasa are serving the deities.

Significance 

The temple is one of the ancient temple of Vrindavan. It is among the seven significant temples of Vrindavan which includes  Radha Madan Mohan temple, Radha Gokulnanda temple, Radha Raman temple, Radha Govinda temple, Radha Gopinath temple and Radha Shyamsundar temple.  The temple also houses the Giriraj Shila having the footprints of Krishna which was believed to be given to Sanatana Goswami by Krishna himself. According to popular belief, four parikramas (circumambulation) of the Radha Damodar Temple is equal to one circumambulation of Govardhana Hill. There are also samadhis of many Gaudiya saints including Rupa Goswami Samadhi and Jiva Goswami Samadhi inside the premises of the temple. Founder of ISKCON, Srila Prabhpada also stayed in this temple for six years before heading to United States of America for preaching about Krishna.

Temple deities 
thumb|Deities of Radha Damodar Temple
Along with Shri Radha Damodar ji and Giriraj Shila, the other deities worshiped in the temple are - Shri Radha Vrindavanchandra Ji, Shri Radha Madhav Ji, Shri Gaur Nitai and Shri Jagannath Dev Ji.

Temple timings 
The time zone (UTC+05:30) observed through India by the priest  -

Morning - 4:30 AM to 1:00 PM

Evening - 4:30 PM to 9:00 PM

See also 

Radha Kund
Radha Krishna
Kusum Sarovar
Govardhan Shila
Radha Rani Temple
Nidhivan, Vrindavan
Radha Raman Temple
Radha Damodar Temple, Junagadh
Radha Vallabh Temple, Vrindavan
Radha Madan Mohan Temple, Vrindavan

References

External Links 
 https://www.radhadamodarmandir.com/

Radha Krishna temples
Tourist attractions in Mathura district
Hindu temples in Mathura district
Gaudiya Vaishnavism
 Mathura district
 Krishna temples
Vrindavan
16th-century Hindu temples